In and Out is an album by American guitarist James Blood Ulmer recorded in 2009 and released on the German In+Out label.

Reception

The All About Jazz review by Dan Bilawsky awarded the album 3 stars, and stated, "Throughout these ten tracks, Ulmer—joined by bassist Mark E. Peterson and drummer Aubrey Dayle—journeys through bold blues music, self-styled swing, psychedelic rock and far-reaching free jazz. The Independent's Phil Johnson said "guitarist/ vocalist Ulmer sounds like an even bluesier version of his former self, oddly accented rhythmic flurries poised somewhere between Ornette Coleman and Jimi Hendrix".

Track listing
All compositions by James Blood Ulmer
 "No Man's Land" – 4:27
 "A Thing for Joe" – 5:54
 "Fat Mama" – 6:09
 "Eviction" – 4:14
 "Baby Talk" – 4:03
 "Maya" – 7:46
 "My Woman" – 4:35
 "High Yellow" – 5:12
 "I Believe in You" – 5:22
 "Backbiter" – 5:38

Personnel
James Blood Ulmer – guitar, vocals, flute
Mark Peterson – electric bass, acoustic bass
Aubrey Dayle – drums, backing vocals

References

James Blood Ulmer albums
2009 albums